Michel Nadeau (8 Novembre 1946 - 19 October 2021) was a Canadian administrator and journalist. He served as Director-General of the Institute for Governance of Private and Public Organizations.

Biography
From 1974 to 1984, Nadeau was a columnist and financial editor for Le Devoir. He then held several senior management positions at the Caisse de dépôt et placement du Québec for 18 years. He was chairman of CDP Capital, which held over $125 billion in assets. For several years, he sat on the corporate governance committee of the Pension Investment Association of Canada. He served on the boards of directors of several corporations and non-profit organizations, such as the Montreal World Film Festival.

Michel Nadeau died on 19 October 2021 at the age of 75.

References

1947 births
2021 deaths
French Quebecers
Canadian newspaper journalists
Journalists from Quebec